Delias frater is a butterfly in the family Pieridae. It was described by Karl Jordan in 1911. It is found in New Guinea.

The wingspan is about 56 mm. Adults are similar to Delias eichhorni, but the white area on the upper surface of the forewings is smaller and more diffuse at the edges, and sometimes so much diffused with black as to be almost entirely suppressed. The black discocellular bar of the underside of the forewings is very thin and angulate, being sometimes almost interrupted before R2 (vein 5).

Subspecies
D. f. frater (Mount Goliath, Langda, Irian Jaya; Western Province, Papua New Guinea)
D. f. soror Toxopeus, 1944 (Korupun, Irian Jaya)
D. f. far Schroder & Treadaway, 1982 (Paniaia, Irian Jaya)

References

External links
Delias at Markku Savela's Lepidoptera and Some Other Life Forms

frater
Butterflies described in 1911